"Shake Your Body (Down to the Ground)" is a song recorded by The Jacksons for their 1978 album Destiny, and released as a single the same year. It peaked at No. 7 in the Billboard Hot 100 in May 1979.

Background
The most successful of the Jacksons' recordings for Epic, "Shake Your Body" (originally demoed as "Shake a Body") was produced by the Jackson brothers, written by Randy and Michael, and featured Michael on lead vocals. The chorus "let's dance/let's shout (shout)/shake your body down to the ground" was inspired by an ad-lib from Marvin Gaye's "Got to Give It Up": "Let's dance/let's shout (shout)/gettin' funky's what it's all about" and the rhythmic pattern from Teddy Pendergrass's "Get Up, Get Down, Get Funky, Get Loose" (from his album Life Is a Song Worth Singing was released a couple of months previously).

Release

Released to radio in a single edit of three minutes and forty-five seconds (and played in its full eight-minute album version by clubs), the single reached No. 3 in Cash Box magazine and peaked at no. 7 on the Billboard Hot 100 chart. It also peaked at No. 3 on the Billboard Hot Soul Singles chart. The ensuing 12" Disco Single Remix featured a more focused drum and rhythm track, as well as the new synthesizer-voiced three octave climbing glissando that was not heard on the album version. "Shake Your Body" sold over two million copies, attaining platinum status from the Recording Industry Association of America.

In the UK and Ireland, the single was a major success on the charts, peaking there likewise at No. 4 and No. 9 in 1979. In Australia the single was less successful only reaching No. 59 on the charts at that time. In New Zealand and Canada at peaked in the charts at No. 8 and No. 13.

Cash Box said it has a "rippling rhythm section, solid beat and stunning chorus" but that Michael Jackson's vocals are the "centerpiece." Record World said it has an unusual arrangement and "has a bit of gospel in the beat and features Michael Jackson's high, distinct vocals."

The B-side on the 7" was "That's What You Get (for Being Polite)" while the B-side on the 12" was "All Night Dancin'".

Live performances
The first performance of "Shake Your Body (Down to the Ground)" was on the second leg of The Jacksons' Destiny Tour in 1979. Later, it was performed on the Triumph Tour in 1981. In 1984 it was performed on the Victory Tour. In 1987, it was performed on the first leg of Michael Jackson's Bad Tour. It was also performed during the Michael Jackson 30th Anniversary concerts at the Madison Square Garden in New York City in September 2001; it would be the last song performed live by the Jacksons before the death of Michael Jackson in 2009. The song was going to be performed as an instrumental interlude (merged with "Don't Stop 'Til You Get Enough") during Jackson's 2009-2010 This Is It concert series at London's O2 Arena, which was cancelled due to his sudden death. The song was remixed and released on the deluxe edition of the Michael Jackson's Immortal album.

Charts

Weekly charts

Year-end charts

Certifications

References

External links
Genius: Shake Your Body (Down to the Ground) - Lyrics

1978 songs
1979 singles
The Jackson 5 songs
Songs written by Michael Jackson
Songs written by Randy Jackson (The Jacksons)
Songs about dancing
Epic Records singles